The Maryland Sheep and Wool Festival is the largest and longest-running showcase of domestic sheep and wool in the United States. The 2010 festival was the 37th consecutive. It is held at the Howard County Fairgrounds in West Friendship, Maryland.

History
The festival was started in 1973. In 2003 it attracted over 70,000 people. The 2014 festival was the 40th consecutive. It is sponsored by the Maryland Sheep Breeders Association. The festival's purpose is to "educate the public about sheep and wool".  It is organized and staffed by volunteers from both the sheep breeding and fiber communities.

It is held annually during the first weekend in May at the Howard County Fairgrounds in West Friendship, Maryland. It has vendors of wool yarn, and judging of more than 30 sheep breeds. Vendors of other fiber-producing livestock such as goats, angora rabbits, llamas, and alpaca also attend.

The festival includes live music, a parade of breeds, a sheep to shawl contest, and border collie demonstrations. Food vendors sell various lamb dishes including lamb burgers, gyros, and lamb sausage. There are also lamb cooking contests and lamb cooking demonstrations.

A virtual festival was held in 2020 caused by the COVID-19 pandemic.

See also
New York State Sheep and Wool Festival
Miss Wool of America Pageant

References

External links

Map: 

Agricultural shows in the United States
Festivals in Maryland
Tourist attractions in Howard County, Maryland
1973 establishments in Maryland
Animal festival or ritual
Wool organizations